Antonio Riva is the name of:
Antonio Riva (pilot) (1896–1951), Italian pilot and World War I flying ace
Antonio Riva (politician) (1870–1942), Swiss politician and President of the Swiss Council of States
Antonio Riva (architect) of the Baroque